George Kirkpatrick may refer to:

 George Airey Kirkpatrick (1841–1899), Canadian Conservative Party politician
 George G. Kirkpatrick Jr. (1938–2003), Florida state politician
 George Ross Kirkpatrick (1867–1937), writer and 1916 Socialist Party Vice-Presidential candidate
 George Macaulay Kirkpatrick (1866–1950), British general